Events from the year 1790 in Great Britain.

Incumbents
 Monarch – George III
 Prime Minister – William Pitt the Younger (Tory)
 Parliament – 16th (until 11 June), 17th (starting 10 August)

Events
 1 January – the 91-mile Oxford Canal is opened throughout, providing an important link between the River Thames at Oxford and Coventry in the English Midlands.
 30 January – Henry Greathead's Original rescue life-boat is tested on the River Tyne.
 14 March – William Bligh arrives back in Britain with the first report of the Mutiny on the Bounty.
 April–May – Josiah Wedgwood shows off his first reproductions of the Portland Vase.
 16 June – 28 July: a general election is held, giving Pitt an increased majority.
 23 June – alleged London Monster arrested in London: he later receives two years for three assaults.
 28 June – Forth and Clyde Canal opened.
 4 July – Third Anglo-Mysore War: in India, Britain allies with the Nizam of Hyderabad against the Kingdom of Mysore.
 27 July – the Treaty of Reichenbach is signed between Britain, Prussia, Russia and the Dutch Republic allowing Austria to retake the Austrian Netherlands.
 4 August – Lord North becomes Earl of Guilford upon the death of his father and moves from the House of Commons to the House of Lords.
 undated
 First organised otter hunt established, at Culmstock, Devon.
 James Wyatt erects a cast-iron footbridge at Syon Park, Isleworth, the first known British example.

Publications
 1 November – Edmund Burke's work Reflections on the Revolution in France.
 William Blake's work The Marriage of Heaven and Hell.

Births
 6 September – John Green Crosse, surgeon (d. 1850)
 21 November – Edmund Lyons, 1st Baron Lyons, admiral (d. 1858)
 19 December – William Edward Parry, Arctic explorer (d. 1855)

Deaths
 15 January – John Landen, mathematician (born 1719)
 20 January – John Howard, prison reformer (born 1726)
 5 February – William Cullen, physician and chemist (born 1710)
 4 March – Flora MacDonald, Jacobite (born 1722)
 16 May – Philip Yorke, 2nd Earl of Hardwicke, politician (born 1720)
 21 May – Thomas Warton, poet (born 1728)
 17 July – Adam Smith, economist and philosopher (born 1723)
 4 August – Francis North, 1st Earl of Guilford, peer and politician (born 1704)
 24 November – Robert Henry, historian (born 1718)

References

 
Years in Great Britain